The TWTC International Trade Building is a skyscraper in Xinyi District, Taipei, Taiwan. As of 2022, it is the eleventh tallest in Xinyi Planning District (after Taipei 101, The Sky Taipei, Taipei Nan Shan Plaza, Fubon Xinyi A25, Cathay Landmark, Farglory Financial Center, Hua Nan Bank Headquarters, Uni-President International Tower, Taipei City Hall Bus Station, and United Daily News Office Building). The height of building is 142.920 m, the floor area is 111,791.52 m2, and it comprises 34 floors above ground, as well as 3 basement levels.

Tenants
 Argentina Trade and Cultural Office
 Commercial Office of Peru to Taipei
 European Economic and Trade Office
 HSBC Bank (Taiwan)
 India-Taipei Association
 Israel Economic and Cultural Office in Taipei
 Italian Economic, Trade and Cultural Promotion Office
 Korean Mission in Taipei
 Lithuanian Trade Representative Office
 Luxembourg Trade and Investment Office, Taipei
 Mexican Trade Services Documentation and Cultural Office
 Polish Office in Taipei
 PricewaterhouseCoopers Taiwan
 Slovak Economic and Cultural Office 
 Swedish Trade and Invest Council
 Trade Office of Swiss Industries
 Turkish Trade Office in Taipei
 Ulaanbaatar Trade and Economic Representative Office

See also 
 Taipei World Trade Center
 List of tallest buildings in Taiwan
 Xinyi Special District

References

Office buildings completed in 1988
Xinyi Special District
Skyscraper office buildings in Taipei
1988 establishments in Taiwan